Maalegan is an administrative division of Fuvahmulah, Maldives. This ward stretches along the island fringe facing the northeast sharing borders with Mādhado, Miskimmago, Funādo and Dūndigan.

Places of interest
Bandaara Kilhi: One of the two freshwater lakes in Fuvahmulah. The largest share of the lake (about three-fourths of the whole) is within Maalegan.
Rasgefanno: Previously, the most famous anchorage of the island.
Hukuru Miskih: One of the oldest mosques in the island.
Zikura International College: One of college in Fuvahmulah.

References 

Subdivisions of the Maldives